Derrill Burnham "Del" Pratt (January 10, 1888 – September 30, 1977) was a star running back for the University of Alabama before becoming a professional baseball player. He was a star second baseman in the American League for over a decade, but also saw some action at first base, shortstop, third base and the outfield.

Baseball career
In  he led the American League with 103 RBIs.

In , the Browns were struggling. Owner Phil Ball accused some of the players of intentionally playing poorly so that they could be traded. Ball said, "Every $1,000 I lose on the Browns this season will cost the ballplayers $100. Salaries will be cut next season."
Pratt was offended.  He and teammate Doc Lavan sued Ball for slander. The Sporting News went so far as to call Pratt the Browns' Trotsky. The suit was eventually settled in 1918, and Pratt was traded to the New York Yankees.

After the 1920 season, the Yankees traded Pratt to the Boston Red Sox for Waite Hoyt, but he decided to retire. He was hired as the University of Michigan baseball coach to replace Carl Lundgren (with a recommendation from Branch Rickey) and served as an assistant football coach and freshman basketball coach.  He began preparing the 1921 team, but the Red Sox coaxed him out of retirement before the first game of the season. Upon his return to the Sox in 1921, Pratt batted over .300. He ended his career with the Detroit Tigers.

His career batting average was .292 over twelve seasons, with an on-base percentage of .345. He had a total of 979 RBIs and 857 runs scored. Pratt hit better than .300 six times.

Death
Pratt died in Texas City, Texas on September 30, 1977 at age 89.

See also

 List of Major League Baseball career triples leaders
 List of Major League Baseball career stolen bases leaders
 List of Major League Baseball annual runs batted in leaders

References

External links

1888 births
1977 deaths
St. Louis Browns players
New York Yankees players
Boston Red Sox players
Detroit Tigers players
American League RBI champions
Major League Baseball second basemen
Baseball players from South Carolina
Michigan Wolverines baseball coaches
Michigan Wolverines football coaches
Georgia Tech Yellow Jackets baseball players
Alabama Crimson Tide football players
University of Alabama alumni
Minor league baseball managers
Hattiesburg Timberjacks players
Montgomery Climbers players
Montgomery Billikens players
Waco Cubs players
Galveston Buccaneers players
People from Walhalla, South Carolina